The Piper PA-24 Comanche is an American four-seat or six-seat, low-wing, all-metal, light aircraft of semimonocoque construction with tricycle retractable landing gear. Piper Aircraft designed and developed the Comanche, which first flew on May 24, 1956. Together with the PA-30 and PA-39 Twin Comanches, it made up the core of the Piper Aircraft lineup until the production lines for both aircraft were destroyed in the 1972 Lock Haven flood.

Design and development

The Comanche is a four-seat (or in 260B and 260C models, six-seat), single-engined, low-wing monoplane.  It is an all-metal aircraft with a retractable landing gear. Two prototypes were built in 1956, with the first being completed by June 20, 1956. The first production aircraft, powered by a  Lycoming O-360-A1A engine, first flew on October 21, 1957.  In 1958, it was joined by a higher-powered PA-24-250 with a  Lycoming O-540-A1A5 engine; this model was originally to be known as the PA-26, but Piper decided to keep the PA-24 designation.

In 1964, the  PA-24-400 was introduced. The 260 was also available as the Turbo Comanche C with a Rajay turbocharger, and was introduced in 1970.

Production of the Comanche ended in 1972, when torrential rains from Hurricane Agnes caused the great Susquehanna River flood of 1972, flooding the manufacturing plant and destroying airframes, parts, and much of the tooling necessary for production. Rather than rebuild the tooling, Piper chose to abandon production of the Comanche and Twin Comanche and continue with two newer designs already in production at Piper's other plant in Vero Beach, Florida - the twin-engined PA-34 Seneca and the PA-28R-200 Arrow.

Variants

Comanche 180

The original version of the Comanche was the PA-24, which featured a carbureted  Lycoming O-360-A1A engine, swept tail, laminar flow airfoil, and all-flying stabilator.

The flaps were manually actuated, controlled by the same Johnson bar actuator as the Piper Cherokee.

When new, standard, typically equipped Comanche 180s sold between $17,850 (1958) and $21,580 (1964). A total of 1,143 were built.

Comanche 250
Most 250s had carbureted Lycoming O-540-AIA5 engines, but a small number were fitted out with fuel-injected versions of the same engine. Early Comanche 250s had manually operated flaps and carried  of fuel. Auxiliary fuel tanks ( total) became available in 1961. Electrically actuated flaps were made standard with the 1962 model year.

Comanche 260

Four 260-horsepower (194 kW) versions of the Comanche were introduced beginning in 1965. They were:
PA-24-260 (1965)
PA-24-260B (1966 to 1968)
PA-24-260C (1969 to 1972)
PA-24-260TC (Turbocharged 260C) (1970 to 1972)

A total of 1,029 airplanes were sold from the Comanche 260 line, including the 260TC.

It had four seats, and a -capacity auxiliary fuel system was available as an option.

The 260B had an overall length  more than the previous models due to a longer propeller spinner, not a longer fuselage. The 260B had a third side window and a provision for six seats.

To prevent possible aft center-of-gravity problems due to the increased gross weight and its fifth and sixth seats, the propeller shaft was extended. This moved the center of gravity slightly forward. Often mistaken on the ramp for the 400 model, the slightly longer cowling includes a distinctively longer nose gear door, as compared to the B models and older versions.

Starting in 1970, Piper offered a turbo-normalized variant of the PA-24-260 known as the 260TC with a Lycoming IO-540-R1A5 engine and dual Rajay turbochargers. Twenty-six were produced between 1970 and 1972. Advertised by Piper as a "second throttle", the turbochargers are controlled using a manual wastegate assembly that places an additional handle labeled "boost" next to the throttle handle in the cockpit, effectively creating a secondary throttle.

PA-24-300
In 1967, one aircraft was modified with a  Lycoming engine for trials.  It did not enter production.

PA-24-380
Two prototype aircraft were built in 1961.  They were standard Comanche airframes, but had  Lycoming IO-720-A1A engines with a three-bladed propeller.  The design was modified with an even larger  engine and produced as the PA-24-400.

Comanche 400
The PA-24-400 Comanche 400 was produced from 1964 to 1966. Only 148 PA-24-400s were built.

Cooling problems have happened with the rear cylinders. 

The high fuel burn means that it is expensive to operate.

While identical in planform to other PA-24 models, the 400 is structurally strengthened, primarily in the tail, with an extra nose rib in the stabilator and the vertical fin. The stabilator, vertical fin, and rudder of the 400 share virtually no common parts with the 180, 250, or  Comanches.

Twin Comanche

PA-33

In 1967, a single Comanche was modified by Swearingen with a pressurized cabin. The prototype, powered by a  Lycoming O-540 engine and equipped with Twin Comanche landing gear, was designated the PA-33. First flown on March 11, 1967, the prototype later crashed on takeoff in May 1967 and the project was cancelled.

World records

Max Conrad
When the aircraft took off from Casablanca, it was heavily overloaded and just cleared the airport fence. The Comanche 250 Max Conrad flew for this flight is now located in the museum at the Liberal, Kansas, airport.

He set a closed-circuit distance record in the same aircraft on July 4–6 November 1960, flying .

Kenneth Walker 
On 14 May 1962, Kenneth Walker arrived in Brisbane, Australia, in a PA-24-250 on a delivery flight from San Francisco. Walker's flight was the first ever solo single-engine crossing of the Pacific, and the third solo crossing from the US to Australia. From Brisbane, Walker continued south to deliver the Comanche to the Royal Newcastle Aero Club at Maitland, New South Wales, Australia.

Toku-Hana

In July 1964, Henry Ohye, flying a 1961 PA-24-250, made the first successful trans-Pacific flight from the United States to Japan in a single-engined aircraft. He flew from Los Angeles to Tokyo with stops in Honolulu, Midway, Wake, Guam, and Okinawa.

Myth Too
A 1966 Comanche 260B, named Myth Too and registered  as G-ATOY, was owned by  English aviator Sheila Scott. The aircraft, flown by Scott, holds 90 world-class light aviation records. It is on public display at the National Museum of Flight, Scotland.

Oldest circumnavigator
The circumnavigation by the oldest pilot on record in 1994 was made by Fred Lasby at age 82 in a Comanche 260B.

Accidents
The 1963 Camden PA-24 crash – On March 5, 1963, country music singers Patsy Cline, Lloyd "Cowboy" Copas, and Hawkshaw Hawkins were on board a Comanche owned and piloted by Cline's manager, Randy Hughes, when it crashed in deteriorating weather near Camden, Tennessee, killing all on board.

Specifications (PA-24-260C)

References

External links

Comanche
1950s United States civil utility aircraft
Single-engined tractor aircraft
Low-wing aircraft
Aircraft first flown in 1956